The velar ejective is a type of consonantal sound, used in some spoken languages.

Features
Features of the velar ejective:

Occurrence

See also
 List of phonetics topics

Notes

References

External links
 

Velar consonants
Ejectives
Oral consonants
Central consonants